James Lee Hagedorn (August 4, 1962 – February 17, 2022) was an American politician from Minnesota. The district stretches across southern Minnesota along the border with Iowa and includes Rochester, Austin, and Mankato.

Early life and education
Hagedorn was born in Blue Earth, Minnesota, in 1962, the son of former U.S. Representative Tom Hagedorn and Kathleen Hagedorn (née Mittlestadt). He was raised on his family's farm near Truman, Minnesota, and in McLean, Virginia, near Washington, D.C., while his father served in Congress from 1975 to 1983. Hagedorn graduated from Langley High School.

He graduated from George Mason University with a Bachelor of Arts degree in government and political science in 1993.

Early political career

Government career

Hagedorn served as a legislative aide to U.S. Representative Arlan Stangeland from 1984 to 1991. He then worked in the United States Department of the Treasury as director for legislative and public affairs for the Financial Management Service from 1991 to 1998 and as congressional affairs officer for the Bureau of Engraving and Printing until 2009.

Mr. Conservative blog
From 2002 to 2008, Hagedorn authored a now-deleted blog, Mr. Conservative. According to Mother Jones, the blog made Native Americans a "favorite punching bag" and commented on female Supreme Court justices and Barack Obama's ancestry "in ways many voters won't appreciate". Hagedorn said the blog was intended to be humorous and satirical.

Hagedorn's blogging history led the conservative newspaper the Washington Examiner to run an editorial calling him "the worst midterm candidate in America" in 2018.

U.S. House of Representatives

Elections

2010 

Hagedorn lost the Republican nomination for Minnesota's 1st congressional district in the 2010 election.

2014 

Returning to Minnesota in 2013, he won the Republican nomination, but lost to Democratic incumbent Tim Walz.

2016 

Hagedorn again won the Republican nomination, and again lost to Walz in a closer race.

2018 

Hagedorn received the Republican nomination, despite the National Rifle Association endorsing another candidate, state Senator Carla Nelson, who also received funds from Representatives Elise Stefanik, Richard Uihlein and Paul Singer. Hagedorn described himself as the most conservative candidate, who was loyal to Donald Trump.

After Hagedorn won the primary, then-head of the National Republican Congressional Committee, Representative Steve Stivers, said of the viewpoints expressed on Hagedorn's blog, "that is news to me". The NRCC spokeswoman said the posts were inappropriate and not condoned by the group.

In the general election, with Walz giving up the seat to run for governor of Minnesota, Hagedorn defeated Democratic nominee Daniel Feehan, a former Department of Defense official, in a very close race.

2020 

Hagedorn was reelected in 2020, narrowly defeating Feehan again.

Tenure

According to the McCourt School of Public Policy at Georgetown University, Hagedorn held a Bipartisan Index Score of -0.0 in the 116th United States Congress for 2019, placing him 190th out of 435 members. Based on FiveThirtyEight's congressional vote tracker at ABC News, Hagedorn voted with Donald Trump's stated public policy positions 94.4% of the time, making him average in the 116th United States Congress according to predictive scoring (district partisanship and voting record).

Depictions of Jesus
In 2020, in response to activist Shaun King saying that depictions of Jesus as white should be destroyed, Hagedorn wrote that the Democratic Party and Black Lives Matter movement "are at war with our country, our beliefs and western culture." In response to critiques that the term "Western culture" has been used to promote white nationalism, Hagedorn said, "The notion that statues and images of Jesus Christ somehow represent white supremacy and should be destroyed is ludicrous and represent a growing intolerant movement on the left to silence any voices that do not align with their radical secular views." His comments led several corporate donors, including Intel and UnitedHealth Group, to ask him to return their donations.

Office funding
In 2020, LegiStorm released an analysis of Hagedorn's office spending, finding that the office had spent more than one fifth of its $1.4 million annual office budget on publicly funded constituent mail. Around 40% of his office's annual budget was spent in the first quarter of 2020, surpassing any other member of Congress during the same time period. Some expenses for Hagedorn's mailings went to a firm partially owned by a part-time Hagedorn staffer. Hagedorn initiated an internal review of his office's spending and reported the findings to the House Ethics Committee, which declined to pursue the matter. As a result of the internal review, Hagedorn dismissed his chief of staff and said, "I acknowledge responsibility for the oversight of my office and will continue to make any necessary management improvements."

In October 2020, Politico alleged that Hagedorn "appears to have enjoyed rent-free use of a campaign office supplied by a political donor." Hagedorn denied the report, saying his campaign had leased a post office box and not office space in the building in question.

Contesting election results
In December 2020, Hagedorn was one of 126 Republican members of the House of Representatives to sign an amicus brief in support of Texas v. Pennsylvania, a lawsuit filed at the United States Supreme Court contesting the results of the 2020 presidential election, in which Joe Biden defeated Donald Trump. The Supreme Court declined to hear the case on the basis that Texas lacked standing under Article III of the Constitution to challenge the results of an election held by another state.

On January 7, 2021, Hagedorn objected to the certification of the 2020 presidential election results in Congress based on false claims of voter fraud.

Committee assignments
Committee on Agriculture
Subcommittee on Livestock and Foreign Agriculture
Subcommittee on Nutrition, Oversight, and Department Operations
Committee on Small Business
Subcommittee on Rural Development, Agriculture, Trade and Entrepreneurship
Subcommittee on Contracting and Workforce

Caucus memberships
 Republican Study Committee

Personal life
Hagedorn was married to Jennifer Carnahan, the former chair of the Republican Party of Minnesota. They lived in Blue Earth, Minnesota.

Hagedorn was Lutheran.

Health and death
Hagedorn was diagnosed with stage 4 kidney cancer in 2019 and subsequently received immunotherapy. In December 2020, he underwent surgery to remove the diseased kidney. In July 2021, Hagedorn announced that his cancer had returned.

In January 2022, Hagedorn was admitted to the Mayo Clinic Hospital in Rochester, Minnesota, after testing positive for COVID-19; he had previously been vaccinated against the disease. Hagedorn died on February 17, 2022, at the age of 59. He was buried at Riverside Cemetery in Blue Earth.

See also
 List of United States Congress members who died in office (2000–)

References

External links

 

1962 births
2022 deaths
21st-century American male writers
21st-century American non-fiction writers
21st-century American politicians
American male bloggers
American bloggers
American Lutherans
Burials in Minnesota
Candidates in the 2014 United States elections
Candidates in the 2016 United States elections
Deaths from kidney cancer
Deaths from cancer in Minnesota
George Mason University alumni
Lutherans from Minnesota
People from Blue Earth, Minnesota
Place of death missing
Republican Party members of the United States House of Representatives from Minnesota
United States Department of the Treasury officials
United States congressional aides